The 2009 Hall of Fame Tennis Championships (also known as the Campbell's Hall of Fame Tennis Championships for sponsorship reasons) is a tennis tournament played on outdoor grass courts. It was the 34th edition of the Hall of Fame Tennis Championships, and is part of the ATP World Tour 250 series of the 2009 ATP Tour. It took place at the International Tennis Hall of Fame in Newport, Rhode Island, United States, from July 6 through July 12, 2009.

The singles field is led by Mardy Fish, Fabrice Santoro.

Finals

Singles

 Rajeev Ram defeated  Sam Querrey, 6–7(3–7), 7–5, 6–3
It was Ram's first career title.

Doubles

 Jordan Kerr /  Rajeev Ram defeated  Michael Kohlmann /  Rogier Wassen, 6–7(6–8), 7–6(9–7), [10–6]

External links
 

Hall of Fame Tennis Championships

2009